Parkview Senior Primary School is one of the primary schools in Johannesburg, South Africa, at the corner of Dundalk Avenue and Dee Road Parkview, Gauteng 2193. It offers grades 4 through 7.

History 

On 10 April 1917, the Parkview Government School opened its doors to 19 children, one teacher, and acting headmistress Mrs. Endly. The wood and iron building consisted of two rooms on the site of the present Parkview Junior School in Ennis Road Parkview. Three months after the school was opened, Miss G.E Lance was appointed principal. The years that followed were difficult years. School attendance was greatly affected by epidemics such as Spanish influenza and Scarlet fever, as well as by a number of strikes.

By 1919 the school boasted three teachers and 78 pupils. One class had to be accommodated in the children’s cloakroom, the beginning of Accommodation problems which would plague the school for years to come. By 1920, enrolment had risen to 100, but there was only accommodation for 65 pupils. For the next thirty years the increase in enrolment was to outstrip the provision for additional classrooms. As the numbers increased relief was obtained by using both the staff room and principal’s office as classrooms, as well as temporary erected classrooms on the school grounds. By 1925 enrollment was up to 245 pupils. Major renovations took place boasting four new classrooms, a new cloakroom, staff room and out buildings. Classes were large, with 52 in a class; pupils seated three to a desk.

On 26 July 1932 the school was divided. The junior primary remained on the old site in Ennis Road, while the senior school with 301 pupils moved to the new school of eight classrooms on the  site surrounded by Dundalk Avenue, Dee Road and Donegal Avenue. The Administrator of the Transvaal, J.S. Smit, officially opened the school on Saturday 17 September 1932. Both schools retained the same school uniform, colours (those of the Union Jack flag) and the badge with the letters P.V.S. – the abbreviation for Parkview Senior School.

External links 

Schools in Gauteng
Primary schools in South Africa